619 Western is a building at 619 Western Avenue in Seattle.

From 1980 to 2011 it hosted an artist community.

References

External links
Sixnineteen - video documentary

Public art in Seattle
Downtown Seattle
Commercial buildings in Seattle